The UPEI Student Union (UPEISU) is the students' union representing full-time undergraduate students at the University of Prince Edward Island. It is funded by a student fee collected by the university, and provides advocacy, services, and amenities. The UPEISU Executive and UPEISU Council are elected through general elections of the UPEI full-time undergraduate student body. The Executive is made up a President, VP Academic and External, VP Student Life, and VP Finance. The UPEISU Council sits bi-weekly throughout the academic semester and includes representatives from faculty and special interest groups.

The amenities and services provided by the UPEISU include:
Health and Dental Insurance, Charlottetown Transit System UPASS, Representation and Advocacy - including membership and lobbying in partnership with Canadian Alliance of Student Associations (CASA), Inspiring Innovation Fund, Student Academic Enrichment Fund, Off-Campus Housing Coordination, Volunteer Match Maker, Promotions and Advertising, UPEI Student Handbook, and the W.A. Murphy Student Centre (in collaboration with UPEI).

The businesses and operations of the UPEISU include:  
 The Fox and the Crow - A pub and café combo which serves a full restaurant menu as well as coffee, tea, specialty drinks, and fresh baked goods.    
 The Cadre - student-run (and editorially autonomous) newspaper.
 The Nexus - the official yearbook of UPEI.

The UPEI Student Union publishes the school newspaper called The Cadre, which gained attention by becoming one of the first Canadian publications to print the controversial Muhammad cartoons from the Jyllands-Posten.

References

External links 

Student Union
PEI